Danny Heifetz (born 1964 in New York City) is an American musician who is perhaps best known for being the drummer for American experimental rock group, Mr. Bungle from 1989, until their disbandment in 2000. Heifetz  also plays trumpet, guitar, bass and piano and currently teaches music lessons in Sydney, Australia.  He is the grandson of the late violinist Jascha Heifetz.

Played with 
 Embryo (with Ryan Mallory)
 Snowblind (with Blair Hatch and Hector Nunez)
 Persuasion (with Matt Johnson, Gregor Verbinski and BlairH)
 The Drivers (1981–1983; with GregorV, John Thum, RyanM and Rick MacDonald)
 The Cylon Boys Choir (1981–1982; with John Nau, Gerald Gates, Michael Cronin, Andrew Harvey, John Hench and GV)
 Barn (1987–1988; same minus MW)
 Mr. Bungle (1989–2000)
 Dieselhed (1989–2000)
 Link Wray (1997–2002)
 Merle Morris (2004–2007)

Currently active 
 Neil Hamburger and the Hungry Man Band
 Old Man River
 Secret Chiefs 3 (most recently on Winter 2012 U.S. West Coast Tour)
 The Curse of Company
 The Exiles
 The Tango Saloon
 Virgil Shaw

Collaborations 
 Andrew Covell
 Badly Drawn Boy
 Corduroy
 Darren Stratti
 Delia Obst
 Granfaloon Bus
 Harry Vanda
 John Paul Young
 Nations by the River
 Paul Greig
 Phillip Johnston
 Plainfield (band)
 Robi DelMar
 The Cutters
 The Holy Soul
 Youth Group
 Zip Code Rapists

Personal life 
As of September, 2013, he lives back in Sydney, Australia (after spending 2011 in the US). Grandson of Jascha Heifetz.

External links 

Exiles Website
theHEAD Bandcamp Site
Mr. Bungle Fansite
The Danny Heifetz Gallery

1964 births
Living people
American expatriates in Australia
American people of Lithuanian-Jewish descent
Jewish heavy metal musicians
American rock drummers
Mr. Bungle members
Musicians from New York City
20th-century American drummers
American male drummers
Dieselhed members
20th-century American male musicians